The 1943 NCAA Golf Championship was the fifth annual NCAA-sanctioned golf tournament to determine the individual and team national champions of men's collegiate golf in the United States. The tournament was held at the Olympia Fields Country Club in Olympia Fields, Illinois, a suburb of Chicago.

Yale claimed the team title, the Bulldogs' first national championship (at an NCAA-sponsored event). The individual title was won by Wally Ulrich from Carleton College.

Contested during the midst of World War II, only seven teams contested the 1943 tournament, a decrease of six from the previous year.

Team results

Note: Top 10 only
DC = Defending co-champions
Note: Defending co-champion Stanford did not qualify.

References

NCAA Men's Golf Championship
Golf in Illinois
NCAA Golf Championship
NCAA Golf Championship
NCAA Golf Championship